Meadowvale Village (originally Meadowvale) is a preserved hamlet and neighbourhood in the city of Mississauga, Ontario, Canada. Its boundaries are Derry Road to the northwest, Creditview Road to the south, Mavis Road to the northeast, and Highway 401 to the southeast. Notable places include: a Georgian manor house built by Charles Horace Gooderham, and the Credit Valley Conservation Area.

History
The village of Meadowvale was founded in 1836 and is Ontario's first heritage conservation district. Charles Horace Gooderham built a "country property", a Georgian manor in northern Mississauga in 1870, which was sold in 1884 and is now the Rotherglen School's Meadowvale Campus. The population increased after Gooderham built his property. In 1968, Meadowvale Village, then part of Toronto Township, became part of the Town of Mississauga.

Modern Meadowvale Village
The area is well-populated, culturally diverse, and contains mostly single-family homes. Meadowvale Village has four schools: three public or Catholic, one Montessori, and some commercial activity; mainly along Old Derry Road. The Credit Valley Conservation Area and Credit River pass through the area. Roads include Old Derry Road, John Watt Boulevard, Gooderham Estates Boulevard, Silverthorn Mill Avenue, and Second Line West. There are extant ruins of the abutments for a bridge of the Toronto-Guelph Suburban Line, where it once crossed a canal for a mill.

References

Neighbourhoods in Mississauga